Mount Trashmore Park, also known simply as Mount Trashmore, is a city park located in Virginia Beach, Virginia which opened in 1974, Mount Trashmore is an example of landfill reuse, as its creation consisted of the conversion of an abandoned landfill into a park. Facilities include three large, two medium, and six small picnic shelters, playground areas, four volleyball areas, parking, vending machines and restrooms. Mount Trashmore Park also has multiple walking trails — a Perimeter Trail that measures , a Lake Trail that measures , and a Mountain Trail that measures . The park also features two lakes where fishing is permitted. Since its opening in the 1970s, it ranks as the most popular park in Virginia Beach, with attendance of over one million visitors a year.

The park is open seven days a week from 7:30 a.m. until sunset.

Kids' Cove

Kids' Cove, an innovative playground designed for children using children's ideas and input, is also located at Mount Trashmore Park, and opened in 1993. The playground is wheelchair-accessible and it was constructed totally by volunteers and coordinated by the Virginia Beach Jr. Woman's Club.

A new, $1.4 million Kids' Cove reopened to the public in December 2010. The new playground is nearly twice the size of its predecessor.

Skate Park
Mount Trashmore Skate Park is located in the northeast corner of the park, where numerous professional skateboarders have made appearances, including Tony Hawk. The  skate park opened in August 2003 features an extensive street course including an above-ground,  bowl. On 16 August 2006, a fire damaged a significant portion of the skate park. The skate park was completely rebuilt as of March 2007.

References

External links

City of Virginia Beach Parks and Recreation Page 
Hamptonroads.com Parks Page
Mount Trashmore Virginia Beach Attraction and Landmark
Virginia Beach Mount Trashmore
Mount Trashmore Official Web Page

Virginia municipal and county parks
Urban public parks
Parks in Virginia Beach, Virginia
History of Virginia Beach, Virginia